Page McConnell is the self-titled debut album from Phish keyboardist Page McConnell. It was recorded over a two-year period following the break-up of Phish. The album was produced by Bryce Goggin and Jared Slomoff. It was released on April 17, 2007. The three other members of Phish, Trey Anastasio, Jon Fishman and Mike Gordon, all perform on the album, but the entire band does not appear together on any of the tracks.

Track listing
"Beauty of a Broken Heart" - 3:41
"Heavy Rotation" - 10:44
"Maid Marian" - 5:10
"Close to Home" - 4:21
"Runaway Bride" - 3:57
"Back in the Basement" - 8:27
"Rules I Don’t Know" - 6:04
"Complex Wind" - 5:04
"Everyone But Me" - 5:06

Every single track written by Page McConnell.

Personnel

Musical
Page McConnell - Organ, Synthesizer, Bass, Piano, Accordion, Vocals, Clavinet, Producer, Drum Programming, Synthesizer Bass, Wurlitzer, Toy Piano
Trey Anastasio - Guitar  
Jon Fishman - Drums  
Mike Gordon - Bass  
Jeff Hill - Bass  
Jim Keltner - Drums  
Jared Slomoff - Guitar (Acoustic), Bass, Trumpet, Guitar (Electric), Vocals, Vocals (background), Producer, Engineer  
Adam Zimmon - Guitar

Technical
Bryce Goggin - Producer, Engineer, Mixing
Michelle Holme - Art Direction, Design  
Fred Kevorkian - Mastering  
Shane McCauley - Photography  
Rob O' Dea - Studio Assistant  
Adam Sachs - Studio Assistant  
Kevin Shapiro - Studio Assistant  
Kazu Shibashi - Studio Assistant

References

2007 debut albums
Page McConnell albums